Webster is an unincorporated community in Webster Township, Wayne County, in the U.S. state of Indiana.

History
Webster was laid out in about 1850. An old variant name of the community was called Dover. The post office at Webster has been in operation since 1851.

Geography

References

Unincorporated communities in Wayne County, Indiana
Unincorporated communities in Indiana